The Singaporean passport is a travel document and passport issued to citizens and nationals of the Republic of Singapore. It enables the bearer to exit and re-enter Singapore freely; travel to and from other countries in accordance with visa requirements; facilitates the process of securing assistance from Singaporean consular officials abroad, if necessary; and requests protection for the bearer while abroad.

All Singapore passports are issued exclusively by the Immigration and Checkpoints Authority (ICA) on behalf of the Ministry of Home Affairs. Only Singapore citizens are eligible for this passport. The passport is valid for ten years. The Singapore passport is one of the most powerful passports in the world, having been placed as the most powerful passport itself on numerous occasions. As of 2023, the Singapore and Japan passports are tied as the most powerful passports in the world, with visa-free or visa on arrival access to 193 countries and territories.

Subsequently, the Singapore passport is a popular target for counterfeiters due to the relatively liberal visa requirements for Singaporeans and the tendency for immigration officials to clear Singapore passport holders more quickly. In response, the ICA has thus adopted several measures to foil forgers, including adding digital photos and special ink since October 1999, and converting to a biometric passport from August 2006.

History

The first version of the modern Singapore passport was introduced on 20 June 1966, replacing the Singapore Provisional Passport issued from 17 August 1965. Between 1963 and 1965, Malaysian passports were issued to residents of Singapore when it formed part of Malaysia, and CUKC British passports were issued prior to 1963. The Straits Settlements, of which Singapore was its capital from 1832 until 1946, also issued its own passports prior to World War II.

Singapore Restricted Passport (blue cover)
Between 1967 and 1999, Singapore also issued a Restricted Passport with a blue cover mainly for travel to West Malaysia. The Restricted Passport was conceived due to the fact that many Singaporeans would regularly travel to West Malaysia for business and leisure purposes. The Restricted Passport ceased to be issued after 1999 due to a lack of demand and the red Singapore Passport was deemed to be the only valid travel document for overseas travel by Singaporean citizens from 1 January 2000.

Validity
The Singaporean passport is valid for a period of ten years for passports issued since 1 April 2005 and ten years for passports issued before said date. Before biometric passports were issued on 15 August 2006, passports for male citizens between 11 and 18 were only valid for two years, and had to be renewed or replaced every two years. Biometric passports cannot be modified due to the "write once" policy by ICAO. A new passport is valid for a total period of five years. For the renewal of a passport that has a validity of nine months or less, the new one will have a validity of five years plus the remaining validity in the old passport. However, if a passport is being renewed with a validity of more than nine months, it will be valid for five years and nine months. To travel overseas, a passport must be valid for at least six months.

New passports issued on or after 1 October 2021 for people aged 16 or above will again have a validity of 10 years, with the government citing improved confidence in the security of biometric passports.

Biometric passport
Since 15 August 2006, all newly issued Singaporean passports contain biometric features (BioPass). A major reason for this addition is to comply with the requirements for the US Visa Waiver Program. The features also help to prevent forgery and minimise the abuse of Singaporean passports. The biometric passports contain 64 pages, unlike the machine readable passports, which contain 96 pages. It costs S$70 for a passport. One can apply for the passport on the Internet, by post or by deposit box with applicants having to collect the passport personally. However, if the application is made in person at a Singaporean overseas mission, it will cost S$80 in foreign currency equivalent.

The biometric passport is valid for 5 years for first time applicants, compared with 10 years for previously issued passports without biometric features. Also, the new passport does not accept modifications such as extensions of validity, and updating of photographs due to ICAO's "write once" policy. In a break from long standing practice, the passport number is now unique to each passport, instead of being identical to the holder's NRIC number. Children are no longer allowed to travel on their parents' passports. The biometric passport project cost the Singaporean government a total of S$9.7 million.

A new Singapore biometric passport design was introduced on 26 October 2017. It features a redesigned front cover as well as several new security features such as a Multiple Laser Image (MLI) in the shape of Singapore Island and a window lock of the image of the passport holder which can be viewed as a positive or negative image when tilted and viewed under a light source. New visa page designs, featuring the Singapore Botanic Gardens, Esplanade, Marina Barrage, Gardens by the Bay, Singapore Sports Hub and Punggol New Town were also introduced in the new biometric passport, replacing the previous Central Business District and Esplanade visa page designs.

Physical appearance

Front cover

Singaporean passports are orange in colour, with the words "REPUBLIC OF SINGAPORE" inscribed at the top of the front cover, and the coat of arms of Singapore emblazoned in the centre of the front cover. The motto and the title of the national anthem of Singapore, Majulah Singapura, is inscribed on the scroll of the coat of arms, whilst the word "PASSPORT" is inscribed below. The biometric passport symbol  appears at the bottom of the front cover under the word "PASSPORT".

Passport note

The passport contains a note from the President of Singapore addressing the authorities of all territories:

Information page

Singaporean passports include the following data on the plastic information page:

 (left) Photo of the passport bearer
 Type (PA – biometric passport)
 Code of issuing state (SGP)
 Passport number
 Full name
 Sex (Gender)
 Nationality (Singapore Citizen)
 Date of birth
 Place of birth 
 Date of issue
 Date of expiry
 Modifications 
 Authority
 National ID number

The information page ends with the Machine Readable Zone.

Biometric chip
The embedded chip stores the owner's digitised photograph, name, sex, date of birth, nationality, passport number, and the passport expiry date. This is the same information that appears on the printed information page of every passport. Facial recognition technology was introduced with the release of the ePassport to improve identity verification and reduce identity-related fraud. Iris imaging was later added to complement the biometric fingerprint.

Visa requirements

Visa requirements for Singaporean citizens are administrative entry restrictions by the authorities of other states which are placed on citizens of Singapore. As of March 2023, Singaporean citizens had visa-free or visa on arrival access to 193 countries and territories, ranking the Singapore passport the most powerful in the world(tied with Japan) and in Asia in terms of travel freedom, according to the Henley Passport Index. The Singaporean passport often periodically switches between being 1st or 2nd on the list.

As of January 2023, the passports of Singapore, Brunei, Japan and San Marino are the only ones to allow either visa-free entry or Electronic Travel Authorisation to the world's four largest economies, namely China, India, the European Union and the United States.

Automated border control systems 

Singaporean citizens aged 6 and older are eligible to use the automated clearance lanes at the its country's checkpoints, provided that their biometric identifiers (iris / facial / fingerprints) have been enrolled with ICA. In addition, for young Singapore citizens who wish to use the automated lanes but had collected their passports before turning six, they may enrol their biometrics at the staffed immigration counters (with the supervision of their parent / guardian).

In addition, with Singapore's developed and high-income status, Singaporean citizens who intend to travel as tourists, are also eligible to use the automated border control systems (eGates) when arriving in (or departing from) the various following countries:

a) The Trusted Traveller Program offered by the Immigration Services Agency of Japan (ISA), is limited to:

- directors or full-time employees of the Government of Singapore and its public and corporate affiliates.

- directors or full-time employees of international organizations.

- directors or full-time employees of public companies listed in Japan and their subsidiaries.

- directors or full-time employees of public companies listed in the visa-exempt countries under Japanese visa policy.

- directors or full-time employees of private companies with capital or investment of JPY 500 million.

- business relationship foreign invitee of Japanese government-affiliated institutions or Japanese publicly-listed corporations (and their subsidiaries).

- tourists with platinum or higher-status credit cards.

- spouse or child (unmarried minor) of aforementioned businesspeople or high-net-worth tourists.

b) The e-gate can only be used after first-time arrival and registration at the manual immigration counter. From 20 January 2023 onwards, Singapore passport holders may use autogates at Sultan Iskandar Building and Sultan Abu Bakar Complex in Johor. From 27 February 2023 onwards, Singapore passport holders may also access autogates at KLIA during peak hours (3pm-11pm).

c) APC facility for Singapore passport holders only available at Suvarnabhumi Airport.

d) The Smart Gates at Dubai Airport can only be used after the first-time arrival and registration at the manual immigration touchpoint in Dubai.

Dual citizenship

Dual citizenship is strictly prohibited by the Singapore government. A dual citizen may have acquired citizenship by birth in a foreign country, by descent from a foreign citizen parent, or by registration. Singapore citizens who voluntarily and intentionally acquire citizenship of a foreign country after the age of 18 may be deprived of their Singapore citizenship by the Government. Foreigners who naturalise as Singaporean citizens are required to renounce all foreign citizenships. Persons who are born outside of Singapore and have at least one parent who is a Singapore citizen may register with a Singapore consulate within a year to acquire Singapore citizenship by descent. However, such persons who acquire foreign citizenship (by birth in a jus soli country or naturalisation in another country at an early age) must choose one citizenship before reaching 22 years of age.

Singapore passports issued to dual citizens have their maximum validity capped at up to their 22nd birthday. They can be renewed for the usual 5 year validity free of cost after renunciation of foreign citizenship and completion of the Oath of Renunciation, Allegiance and Loyalty (ORAL) before reaching 22 years of age.

National Service issues
All male citizens are required to be conscripted for two years as National Service (NS). Previously, the Singapore government had a policy of limiting the validity of the passport for boys aged 11 and above. Before travel, they had to apply for a 9-month extension of their passports. Such extensions were added with a rubber stamp. The Singapore government has stated that the objective of such exit control measures is to deter NS-evasion, and that these measures serve as a "psychological reminder" of the citizen's NS obligations.

Since the new biometric passport does not permit such modifications, a decision was made by the Ministry of Defence to do away with limited-validity passports. Exit permits are still required for overseas trips which last longer than three months.

References

External links

 Issuing of Singapore passports
 History of the Singapore passport From passport-collector.com

Passports by country
Government of Singapore
Singaporean nationality law
Foreign relations of Singapore